Saronno is a comune of Lombardy, Italy, in the province of Varese. It received the honorary title of city with a presidential decree in 1960. With an estimated population of 39,351 inhabitants, it is the most densely populated among the big municipalities in its province.

The place is well known for its apricot kernel biscuits (amaretti) and liqueur (amaretto), and is also a relevant manufacturing town.

Main sights

Madonna dei Miracoli
The pilgrimage church of the Madonna dei Miracoli, begun on 8 May 1498 by Vincenzo Dell'Orto, has a dome with very fine architecture on the outside. It was built at three times: the Renaissance part from 1498 to 1516; it includes the apse, the chancel, the dome and the bell tower; in 1556 the sacristy was added; in the end from 1570 to the beginning of the XVII century two other spans were added to the aisles and the facade was erected. During the same period, "l'Hostaria dell'Angelo” was built to restore pilgrims.

Internally the dome is decorated with fine frescoes by Gaudenzio Ferrari, representing The Concert of Angels, while those in the choir are by Bernardino Luini and are among his finest works. These include the Adoration of the Magi, The Presentation, The Marriage of the Virgin and Jesus Discussing with the Doctors in the Temple. Most likely Luini started these frescoes in the spring of 1524. The dome is based on a very particular dodecagonal tambour that could be appreciated also from the outside. It was completed in 1666. In January 1923 Pope Pius XI elevated the church to the status of Minor basilica.

Church of St. Francis of Assisi

The Church of St. Francis is the oldest church in Saronno, with medieval origins. It was a small church outside the walls. In 1154 it was taken over by the friars of the Franciscan order, and in 1297 the Archbishop of Milan, Francesco Fontana da Siena, invited the parishioners to contribute to the building of a bigger church as the existing one was not sufficient for the needs of the friars. There are no traces of this church today because in the 15th century radical changes and restoration were carried out. It was during these changes that the lavish decorations that we see today were added. The church has a central nave with side aisles. The chancel and high altar is at one end of the nave, facing the main doors that are at the other end. The side aisles are lined with richly decorated chapels. The facade is baroque but the sloping roof is a sign of its medieval origins. There are two niches on the facade containing statues, one of St. Anthony and the other of St. Francis. These statues are copies but the originals can be seen in one of the chapels inside the church.

Museo Giuseppe Gianetti

The museum is dedicated to the collection of 18th-century  ceramics gathered by the late Giuseppe Gianetti since 1933. Its permanent collection includes highly notable pieces of Meissen porcelain and Doccia porcelain, Chinese and Japanese ceramics, objects from important Italian and European manufactories and a representative selection of Maiolica milanese. Side by side with Giuseppe Gianetti’s collection, the museum now displays a new section on contemporary works of art made by local and national artists who mainly work with ceramic materials.

Others
Palazzo Visconti (16th century).
Church of St. James (finished in 1612). It has frescoes by Stefano Maria Legnani.
Church of St. Anthony, known since 1385.

Transportation
Saronno railway station is an important junction of the Ferrovienord railway network. This railway has frequent trains to Milan, Como, Varese, Novara and Malpensa Airport. It is also served by the suburban lines S1, S3 and S9.

Saronno Sud railway station is another Ferrovienord station in the southern suburbs of the town, only served by the suburban lines.

Saronno has also various bus lines that connect with nearby towns.

Sports
Saronno is home to the Saronno Comets, the first Italian tchoukball club; their team, Saronno Castor, won 7 of the 9 championships played so far in Italy.

Twin towns
Saronno is twinned with:

  Challans, France (2003) 
  Pegognaga, Italy (2012)

References

External links
Official Saronno website 
Saronno website 
Museo Giuseppe Gianetti website 

Cities and towns in Lombardy